Because Her Beauty Is Raw and Wild is an album by Jonathan Richman. It was released in 2008 on Vapor Records. It is Richman's first proper LP since 2004's Not So Much to Be Loved as to Love.

Track listing
All tracks composed by Jonathan Richman; except where indicated
"Because Her Beauty Is Raw and Wild" – 2:29
"No One Was Like Vermeer" – 3:00
"Time Has Been Going By So Fast" – 2:45
"Es Como El Pan" - 2:59
"Our Drab Ways" - 3:19
"The Lovers Are Here and They're Full of Sweat" - 2:59
"Le Printemps Des Amoreux Est Venue" - 2:35
"When We Refuse to Suffer" - 2:15
"This Romance Will Be Different for Me" - 3:21
"Old World" - 3:22
"Our Party Will Be On The Beach Tonight" - 4:03
"When We Refuse to Suffer" [Second Version] - 3:59
"Here It Is" - 4:27 (Leonard Cohen)
"As My Mother Lay Lying" - 3:05

Personnel
Jonathan Richman - vocals, guitar, percussion
Tommy Larkins - drums, percussion
Greg Keranen - bass on "Old World"
Roger Montalbano - vocals on "When We Refuse To Suffer"
Miles Montalbano - vocals, bass on "When We Refuse To Suffer"
Suzanne Pieskar - piano on "Our Party Will Be On The Beach Tonight"
Technical
Miles Montalbano, Rory Earnshaw - photography

References

2008 albums
Jonathan Richman albums
Vapor Records albums